Unión Deportiva Fuengirola was a football club based in Fuengirola, Málaga, in the autonomous community of Andalusia. Founded in 1992 after a merger of CD Fuengirola, Atlético Fuengirola and Balompédica Fuengirola, it was dissolved in 2001 after a merger with CD Los Boliches, thus becoming UD Fuengirola Los Boliches.

Club background
Club Deportivo Fuengirola - (1931–1992) → ↓
Club Atlético Fuengirola - (1982–1992) → ↓
Unión Deportiva Fuengirola - (1992–2001) → ↓
Asociación Deportiva Balompédica Fuengirola - (1984–1992) → ↑
Unión Deportiva Fuengirola Los Boliches - (2001–present)
Club Deportivo Los Boliches - (1973–2001) → ↑

Season to season

3 seasons in Tercera División

Defunct football clubs in Andalusia
Association football clubs established in 1992
Association football clubs disestablished in 2001
1992 establishments in Spain
2001 disestablishments in Spain
Fuengirola